Radical Motorsport is a British manufacturer and constructor of racing cars. The company was founded in January 1997 by amateur drivers and engineers Mick Hyde and Phil Abbott, who built open cockpit sportscars which could be registered for road use and run on a track without modification. Radical produce a mix of purpose built race cars as well as road legal sports cars in varying specifications. Their most popular car is the Radical SR3.

History

The company's first car, built by Phil Abbott in 1996, the Radical 1100 Clubsport, was based on a Kawasaki motorcycle engine placed inside a small open-cockpit chassis. The cars were intended to run in the 750 Motor Club's races under the Sports 2000 category, with founders Abbott and Hyde driving.

In 1999, Radical had built enough 1100 Clubsports that they decided to create a one-make series based around the car. Backed by the British Racing and Sports Car Club, the series featured identical cars that were open to anyone who owned an 1100 Clubsport.  The same year, Radical debuted their second model, the Prosport. Available with Kawasaki or Suzuki engine up to 1500 cc in displacement, the Prosports were even more powerful and faster than the Clubsports, and included F3-size slick tyres and an adjustable rear wing. The cars were also brought to the United States for the first time, for use in the SCCA D-Sport class in 2000.

Launched in 2001, Radical's next creation was the two-seater SR3, a car which could compete in international racing, such as the FIA's C3 class. An enclosed gear drive unit was developed specifically for the car to replace the traditional motorcycle engine chain drive.

In 2006, Radical would make its largest leap into international motorsport with the development of the SR9, a complete Le Mans prototype in the LMP2 class.  Official partner Rollcentre Racing would debut the car with success in the Le Mans Series and 24 Hours of Le Mans, and SR9s in the hands of independent teams would contest the 24 Hours of Le Mans a further four times.

Current models

The Radical model range has seven different models in various options, most notably in the powerplants, are available on all of the cars.

SR1
The SR1 is the first Radical to have its own racing series – The SR1 Cup – a club, owner-driven racing series that combines competition with training.
Combining exceptional performance and handling with LMP styling and low cost of ownership, the SR1 is priced at £44,500 + VAT. It is powered by an advanced 182 horsepower RPE-Suzuki four-cylinder engine capable of propelling the car 0–60 in 3.5 seconds and eventually to a speed of 138 miles per hour. It is capable of 2.3 g of lateral acceleration.

SR3

The most popular Radical model, over 1,000 SR3 have been built. Although some subtle styling changes have taken place, the fundamental car has not changed since its conception. The car is built on a carbon-steel spaceframe chassis, polyester bodywork and uses a hand built RPE racing spec 4-cylinder engine for power.

SR8 

Based on the SR3, the SR8 is a more extreme version intended for track use but can be registered for the road. The SR8 also features one of the largest engines Radical has ever put in their cars, with the 2700 cc RPE RPX V8 constructed by combining elements of Suzuki inline-4s, and producing 430 horsepower (321 kW). In August 2009 Michael Vergers, driving an SR8LM, set the new lap record (6 minutes, 48 seconds) for a road legal production car at the Nürburgring Nordschleife circuit. This record was beaten by the 991 generation Porsche 911 GT2 in September 2017 with a time of 6:47.25.

It is capable of 0–60 in 2.7 seconds, 178 miles per hour, and a 2.5 g's of lateral acceleration.

One SR8 was converted into an electric car by a team of students Racing Green Endurance from Imperial College London to drive the full length of the Pan-American Highway in May 2010. The project aims to challenge commonly held perceptions surrounding electric vehicles performance and range.

The TMG EV P001 is a road-legal electric sports car by Toyota Motorsport GmbH, based on a modified Radical SR8 chassis.

SR10
Also based on the SR3, the SR10 features a Ford EcoBoost 2.3L, 4 cylinder, turbocharged engine which brings durability and longer service intervals to a similar platform to the SR8. The SR10 continues to use the proven steel space-frame Chassis and Polyester bodywork.

RXC V6
The RXC is a midrange track car between the SR3 and SR8. It is street legal in most countries. It is currently the only closed-top Radical track car level. It is propelled by a Ford Cyclone 3.7 Ti-VCT V6 producing 380 hp and 320 lb-ft torque. The base version is capable of 0 to 60 miles per hour in 2.8 seconds and reaches 175 miles per hour. At its top speed, the RXC produces 900 kg of downforce, equaling its curb weight. A turbocharged version is also available, called the RXC Turbo 500. It produces 530 hp and 481 lb-ft torque. Top speed is estimated to be 185 mph, with zero to sixty acceleration estimated at 2.4 seconds. Production of the RXC began in late 2013 at £111,689.

RXC Spyder
The RXC Spyder is the open top variant of the RXC V8. The standard engine is an RPE 3000cc V8 producing 440 horsepower and the engines maximum power is achieved at 10,500 rpm. The car is built with a seven-speed sequential transmission with paddle shifters fitted as standard, and the car features advanced aerodynamics and styling cues taken from the SR9 LMP2 project. It has a carbon-steel spaceframe based on those of the RXC V8 and the SR9 LMP2. Later updated to the Ford Ecoboost twin turbo V6 engine with 654 hp and quaife 6 speed sequential gearbox, it is capable of 0–60 in 2.7 seconds and 178 miles per hour.

RXC V8 
The RXC V8 is a track day car that is also used in top tier motorsport. It is powered by the same 3-liter V8 as the RXC Spyder.

Motorsport

One-make series
Although Radical began by competing in existing events, it was Radical's creation of their own series that have been the choice of competition for most owners.  Radical currently supports 14 official Radical race series around the world.

In the UK the seven round Radical Challenge championship also runs within the MSVR package, with each meeting featuring two 15-minute qualifying sessions and a pair of 20-minute sprint races, and a 40-minute endurance race with the opportunity for one or two drivers per car. Teams are limited to one set of tyres per weekend, limiting costs and levelling competition.

The Radical SR1 Cup is Open to drivers who have either never held a race licence before, or are still eligible to wear a novice cross on the rear of the car (meaning they have competed in less than six races), the SR1 Cup will lead the drivers through the process of getting on the grid, with a detailed programme of driver training and technical tuition.

In the UK there are also two other main championships open to radical cars. The Open Sportscar Series can accept almost any radical car whilst the Radical Owners Club Bikesports Championship can accommodate cars fitted with bike engines such as the SR1, SR3 and PR6.

Around the world there are numerous Radical single-marque racing championships, running to regulations that broadly mirror those of Radical UK and European racing series.

In North America, there are the following primary series:

Radical North American Masters Championship that visits 7 circuits all around the USA & 1 circuit in Canada.
 Radical Canada Cup that visits several tracks in eastern Canada as well as a single trip to a US track.

Australia also have a very popular series that supports the Bathurst 12 Hour among others that caters to Radical SR3 cars. The 2018 Radical Australia Cup was won by Kim Burke.

The Gulf Radical Cup, promoted by Dubai-based Radical dealer GulfSport Racing has been running since 2006 at the Dubai Autodrome, Yas Marina Circuit and Bahrain International Circuit, and has attracted drivers from more than 20 countries.

Le Mans
In the second quarter of 2005, the company announced its plans to race in the LMP2 class of the Le Mans Series with their new SR9.  The British Rollcentre Racing team would run the first chassis using Judd power before being joined later in the season by a factory team, known as Team Bruichladdich Radical, who used the AER powerplant.  Both teams would score their only points of the season at Nürburgring, with Rollcentre taking third in LMP2 and Radical finishing in fifth. Team Bruichladdich, now Greaves Motorsport, came third in Valencia.

Rollcentre would also run the company's first entry in the 24 Hours of Le Mans.  Although the car finished in a distant 20th place, the car was able to prove its reliability by being able to finish the race only months after being completed.  The Team Bruichladdich Radical squad also flew to the United States for the final round to of the American Le Mans Series, where Radical Chairman, Tim Greaves raced with his own Team Bruichladdich whilst supporting Van de Steur Racing in the third SR9 completed. Tim Greaves owns all the rights to the Radical SR9 and the spares moulds and designs.

For 2007, Rollcentre sold their SR9 as they moved onto a new LMP1 Pescarolo.  Embassy Racing purchased the car and continued running it in the Le Mans Series alongside the factory Radical, while Van der Steur would run a partial schedule in the American Le Mans Series. For 2008, Italian team World Racing Cars purchased the Judd-powered SR9 from Embassy with Swiss team Race Performance contesting the 2010 event.

British Formula Ford

Radical made its debut as a race team in the 2013 British Formula Ford season. Radical signed longtime Radical racer James Abbott to represent the brand in Formula Ford. In the new for 2013 Ford EcoBoost powered Radical chose for the new Sinter LA12 chassis produced by Fluid Motorsports. Former Formula Ford racer Robbie Kerr joined the team as a driver coach for James Abbott. After three rounds, with little success, Radical decided to replace the Sinter with a Mygale M13-SJ. While JTR's Dan Cammish dominated the season, Radical had a reasonable season. After switching to Mygale the results improved, finishing with two third-place finishes in the last three races at Brands Hatch.

See also
 List of car manufacturers of the United Kingdom

References

External links
 Radical Motorsport

British auto racing teams
24 Hours of Le Mans teams
European Le Mans Series teams
Sports prototypes
British racecar constructors
Sports car manufacturers
International GT Open teams
American Le Mans Series teams
Auto racing teams established in 1997